The following is a list of characters in the Gameworld Trilogy by Samit Basu.

Kirin 
Kirin is the primary character in Samit Basu's gameworld trilogy.

Kirin is a half-ravian and half-rakshas, being the son of Narak (rakshas, also Dahn Gem) and Isara (ravian). Kirin often sports a good sense of humor and is best friends with Spikes and Maya. Another attribute of Kirin is his virtuosity with magic and his ability to concoct magic trinkets, which he would sell for money.

In the ravian exodus which followed the great war, Kirin was turned into stone and left behind as he could not pass through the ravian portal due to his mixed half-rakshas nature. When Kirin is discovered and woken up by Spikes, he considers himself human and it is only later that he starts suspecting his ravian origins. Later on, when Dahn Gem tells him of his true nature as half-rakshas and half-ravian, he realises that he has to come to terms with himself and his responsibilities. He then proceeds to Imokoi to rule the rakshases as it were, with an iron fist.

Ravians

Myrdak 

Myrdak of the House of Aegos is a ravian warrior who was assigned to destroy the evil human vaman alliance that held sway over Kol, the most marvellous of human cities and to bring about the return of the rightful King of Kol.

He is described as being the greatest ravian warrior alive, with immense powers of telekinesis, mind control and skill at wielding the sword, making him almost invincible. Pride, arrogance and contempt for lower races of people are inborn in him.

Peori 

Peori, of the House of Hanash is one of the primary antagonists of Samit Basu's novel The Manticore's Secret

She is described as being a ravian warrior, wise and strong, a scholar as well as a warrior. 
She was assigned the vital task of finding the son of Narak and Isara who would be the key to understanding the world.

Behrim 

Behrim, of the House of Esmi, is a veteran of the great war was assigned the task of slaying Danh Gem reborn, destroying the rakshas lords and thereby restoring the honour of the ravians.

Despite being prejudiced against the rakshases, he is ready for peace in this world. When Myrdak and Peori betray the council of the ravians, he undergoes a major change in his perception of the ravians, and admits that they (the ravians) are not so noble after all.

Humans

Lady Temat 

She is the Chief Civilian of Kol (a post akin to the premier of a state in a democracy; Kol is the capital city). She is shown as a skillful politician with a deep understanding of the power struggles inherent in a scenario. She is shown to understand the fact that in trying times, people need a hero to look up to and. She therefore conceptualises Asvin's quest as Simoqin's hero and trains him for the same.

She is shown to have amorous flings from time to time, with one of the flings ending as an attempt on her life. She is good friends with Mantric (Maya's father and the spellbinder of Kol).

Mantric 
Mantric is the most powerful spellbinder in Kol, and the father of Maya. In the series, he is shown inventing the method for making movies. He is good friends with The Silver Dagger and Temat.

Maya 
Maya is one of the main characters in Samit Basu's Gameworld Trilogy.

She is a powerful young spellbinder with a knack for discovering new spells. She is originally Kirin's best friend and is often shown, smuggling Kirin into the library of Enki. When she comes about Kirin's ravian origins, she suspects him to be the hero from the Simoqin prophecies. 
As the story progresses, Maya meets Asvin and falls in love with him. She accompanies Asvin to Bolvudis, and helps him on his missions, especially the journey through the pyramid to get the scorpion man's armour. She also goes on his mission to steal the gauntlet of Tatsu.

She makes entries in her diary which often sound humorous such as

" The civilian's palace, west wing, turtlemonth 8th, 3 pm
Times have participated in enjoyable but potentially illegal and injurious activities: 1.
New combat spells perfected: 7.
Magic: 15/20. Attraction for Asvin: 85/100".

Asvin 
Asvin, prince of Avranti is one of the principal characters in Samit Basu's Gameworld trilogy.

At the beginning of the Simoqin Prophecies, Asvin is sent on an Aswamedh, a journey supposed to bring him fame and glory. However, his own royal guard sabotages his journey as soon as they reach the city limits, tyring to kill him in order for his elder brother to ascend the throne without worry about a plotting younger brother. He is then rescued by the Silver Dagger and brought to Kol. In Kol, he undertakes hero training at Lady Temat's behest, in order to become the prophecised hero of the Simoqin prophecies. Asvin is shown to be handsome, well built. Ladies often try to attract him and are very infatuated by him. He is extremely well mannered - to the point of being annoying. 
In the series, he sometimes comes across as a Don Quixote of sorts. His integrity and character are appreciated by the Scorpion Man, who consoles him after his death and tells him that he can live up to his valour in the imminent final war.

Silver Dagger 
The Silver Dagger is a major character in the Gameworld Trilogy.

He was one of the three members of the super-elite martial arts cult referred to in hushed whispers. He was effectively the most dangerous fighter in the world. He was immune to most poisons. He could kill with any weapon, ranging from the multi pronged kusarigama to the flat wooden spoon. He was a master of the five animal arts the warrior monks of south Xi'en taught and all the secret methods that they didn't teach. In a world without magic, he would definitely be the most dangerous killer alive. In this world, he is certainly the most dangerous mortal. But he was no brute killing machine; he was, among other things skilled at massage, cooking, calligraphy, flower arrangements.

He was a khudran, only three and a half feet tall. He is described as an almost invincible fighter.

Arathogonan 
Also known as Thog the barbarian, he is a member of a hero guild formed in Kol in the wake of Kirin's ascension as dark lord. He is described as a good fighter, as he killed four jaykinis single-handedly.

Lady Temat discovers that he actually is the descendant of the kings of Kol. She does not see him as much of a threat as he also has a soft side to himself. His role is much anticipated in the next book.

Rakshases

Aciram 
The cousin of Danh Gem, and the only one of the rakshases who knew the story of Narak and Isara. He is described as an evil and scheming rakshas, one of those who ate humans. He is initially part of the brotherhood of renewal. Aciram is the chief minister under Kirin, and guides him occasionally. Kirin realizes he could be a threat to him.

Aciram seems to be a rakshas of tremendous powers and cunning, given the fact that he survived the Great War.

Akimis 
A rakshasi, she was in love with the dark lord, Kirin, but ultimately put to death by Aciram.

Akab 
A rakshas who told he is the son of Akarat. He helped Asvin to travel so much time to go to the ravian Myrdak.

Akarat 
A rakshasi who gave her ring to Asvin so that he might save himself from a few rakshases. She fell in love with Prince Chorpulis who had borrowed the sharpest sword from queen Rukmini. She is shown to be a very powerful rakshas, said to be mighty enough in her full form, to wipe out an entire army.

Others

Red Pearl 

A centauress. Also a Silver Phalanx member, escorts asvin and others in the journey through Bleakwood. She was killed by Bali (a vanar). Almost all the males dote on her as she is astoundingly beautiful. Perhaps this comes from the fact that she wears almost no clothing and is seductive, using her attractive status cleverly for the phalanx.

The shapeshifter Red 

Red is introduced in The Manticore's Secret where she plays an important role.
Red is part of the Rainbow Council (a secret council of magic wielding beings who seem to be Kol's last line of defense). Her father, Icelosis had been Red before her. However, Red is very different from the rest of the Rainbow Council because she often breaks their rules. Red also adds to the humor in the plot, with her apparent multiple personas and her inability to exercise any control over them. Also, once the different personas start arguing/fighting among themselves, she has great difficulty restraining them. She is ambitious and desires to rule the world. She rescues Kirin by ending his mental duel with Myrdak and elopes with him, assuming the garb of Maya.

Hooba 
Formerly a shop owner in lost street of Kol, he is now the king of the asurs after being given the iron crown of the asurs by Kirin.

Angda 
Queen of Vanarpuri & Sister of Bali

Gaam 

Gameworld Trilogy